Tomasz Wygonik (born 8 May 1968) is a retired Polish association football defender who played professionally in Poland and the United States.

Wygonik played two games for Wisła Kraków during the 1988-1989 season.  In 1997 and 1998, Wygonik played for the Central Jersey Riptide of the USISL D-3 Pro League.  On 7 February 1999 the Chicago Fire selected Wygonik in the first round (twelfth overall) of the 1999 MLS Supplemental Draft.  On 19 February 1999 the Fire traded him to the Miami Fusion for the Fire's third round pick in the 2000 MLS SuperDraft.  The Fusion waived Wygonik on 2 April 1999.  He then signed with the Hampton Roads Mariners of the USL A-League where he played two seasons.  The Mariners released him in August 2000.  He then played for the Jersey Falcons of the USL PDL from 2002 to 2004.  He continued to play for the amateur Garfield Vistula during the late 2000s.

References

External links
 

Living people
1968 births
Central Jersey Riptide players
Jersey Falcons players
Garfield Vistula players
Virginia Beach Mariners players
Miami Fusion players
Polish footballers
Polish expatriate footballers
Wisła Kraków players
People from Jasło
Chicago Fire FC draft picks
USL Second Division players
A-League (1995–2004) players
USL League Two players
Sportspeople from Podkarpackie Voivodeship
Association football defenders